John Hinde Palmer (1808 – 2 June 1884) was an English barrister and Liberal Party politician who sat in the House of Commons in two periods between 1868 and 1884.

Early life
Palmer was the son of Samuel Palmer of Dulwich Common and his wife Mary Hinde, daughter of L. Hinde.

Career
He was called to the bar at Lincoln's Inn in 1832 and became Queen's Counsel in 1859. He was a J.P. and Deputy Lieutenant of Surrey and Bencher and treasurer of Lincoln's Inn.

Palmer stood for parliament unsuccessfully at Lincoln in 1857 and 1859 general elections and at a by-election in 1862. At the 1868 general election he was elected as a Member of Parliament (MP) for Lincoln, but lost the seat in 1874. He was re-elected in 1880 and held the seat until his death at the age of 75 in 1884.

Personal life
Palmer married Clara Maria D'eyncourt, daughter of Charles Tennyson d'Eyncourt of Bayons Manor in Lincolnshire. He died at St George's Square, London on 2 June 1884 and was buried at West Norwood Cemetery.

References

External links
 

1808 births
1884 deaths
Members of Lincoln's Inn
Deputy Lieutenants of Surrey
Liberal Party (UK) MPs for English constituencies
UK MPs 1880–1885
UK MPs 1868–1874
Politics of Lincoln, England
Burials at West Norwood Cemetery